Kim Yong-Tae (born May 20, 1984) is a  South Korean football player who recently plays for Indonesian club Pusamania Borneo in the Liga 1.

References

External links 
 

1984 births
Living people
South Korean footballers
Daejeon Hana Citizen FC players
Ulsan Hyundai FC players
Gimcheon Sangmu FC players
Busan IPark players
Chungju Hummel FC players
K League 1 players
K League 2 players
Association football midfielders